The Norwegian University College for Agriculture and Rural Development (Høgskulen for landbruk og bygdeutvikling (HLB)) is a small private university college in Klepp, Jæren, south of Stavanger, Norway. The rector is a rural anthropologist, Prof. Dag Jørund Lønning.

Mission
The HLB teaches and researches in the fields of agriculture and rural development. It offers a BA in Rural Development. Study is possible through online learning, with only a few days per month residence on campus. It receives a core grant from the Norwegian government as well as student fee and project income.

Research
HLB has research and development projects funded by the European Union and national grants, focusing on rural and agricultural development and innovation, cultural landscape management and soil protection, demographic development and rural/regional tourism.

References

Universities and colleges in Norway